Service court or service box is the area the served object must land in certain racket sports such as:
 Badminton
 Pickleball
 Tennis